Cosmorama is a municipality in the state of São Paulo, Brazil. The city has a population of 7,298 inhabitants and an area of 443.8 km².

Cosmorama belongs to the Mesoregion of São José do Rio Preto.

References

Municipalities in São Paulo (state)